AmaWaterways is a Calabasas, California based river cruise company that offers cruises in Europe, Southern Africa, Southeast Asia, South America, and Egypt. Its price range is considered "mid-tier" among river cruises. It had a fleet of 26 ships as of 2022.

History
AmaWaterways was co-founded in 2002 by Rudi Schreiner, Jimmy Murphy, and Kristin Karst. Schreiner had been one of the pioneers of the river cruise industry after the Rhine–Main–Danube Canal opened in 1992. Schreiner was still the president and co-owner of the company as of 2018.

Present day

AmaWaterways cruise ships ply a number of rivers in Europe, including the Danube, Rhine, Seine, Douro, Moselle, Main, Garonne, and Rhône. Outside Europe, their ships cruise the Mekong and Chobe rivers.

At each port of call, there are guided excursions that are graded according to the difficulty level of the walking. The company also caters to bicyclists, golfers, and other active passengers. Starting in 2016, it offered "cruise and bike trips on the Rhine, Seine and Douro".

Cruises are full-board and include wine and beer with meals as well as a cocktail hour. AmaWaterways is reportedly the only river cruise line to belong to the gourmet chain La Chaîne des Rôtisseurs.

Unusually for river cruises, there are hair salons on AmaWaterways ships, as well as spas, gyms, and libraries.

Special interest cruises
To attract families with younger children, AmaWaterways partnered with Adventures by Disney to create Disney-themed cruises that feature the Christmas markets in cities on the Danube and Rhine rivers, among others. 

The company has also offered promotions for solo travellers. On four ships (the AmaDolce, AmaLyra, AmaCello, and AmaDante), single cabins are available without a supplemental fee.

Fleet
As of 2022, AmaWaterways had a fleet of 26 ships. One of these, the AmaMagna, is the largest cruise ship on the Danube. Roughly twice as wide as other cruise ships on the Danube, the AmaMagna is meant to offer passengers more roomy accommodations and more dining options than would be possible on a narrower river cruise ship.

References

External links

 

American companies established in 2002
Companies based in Calabasas, California
Cruise lines
River cruise companies
River cruise ships
Transport companies established in 2002